Acupalpus egenus is an insect-eating ground beetle of the genus Acupalpus.

References

egenus